The Open University of Catalonia is a private open university based in Barcelona, Spain.

The UOC offers graduate and postgraduate programs in Catalan, Spanish and English in fields such as Psychology, Computer Science, Sciences of Education, Information and Knowledge Society, and Economics. Also, an Information and Knowledge Society Doctoral Program is available that explores research fields such as e-law, e-learning, network society, education, and online communities. It has support centers in a number of cities in Spain, Andorra, Mexico and Colombia.

The UOC is also a parent institution of Institut Barcelona d'Estudis Internacionals (IBEI).

Organization and administration

Chairs 
 UNESCO Chair in Education and Technology for Social Change
 UNESCO Chair on Food, Culture and Development
 Miró Chair
 UOC-Telefónica Chair in Design and Multimedia Creation
 UOC- BSA Chair in Applied Research and Data Analysis in Health
 IBM-UOC Chair in Cybersecurity

Academics
The Open University of Catalonia offers 25 bachelor's programs, 54 master's programs and 8 doctoral degrees.

Faculties 
The UOC's course offering is divided into these Faculties:

 Faculty of Arts and Humanities
 Faculty of Economics and Business
 Faculty of Health Sciences
 Faculty of Information and Communication Sciences
 Faculty of Computer Science, Multimedia and Telecommunications
 Faculty of Law and Political Science
 Faculty of Psychology and Education Sciences

Affiliated schools:
 Institut Barcelona d'Estudis Internacionals (IBEI)

Institutional repository 
The UOC makes O2, their institutional repository, available to provide open access to digital publications produced by the UOC community in the course of its research, teaching and management activities.

Research publications 
The UOC studies promote the following publications:
 Artnodes. A journal about art, science and technology
 BiD. University text on library and information science (co-published with the University of Barcelona)
 Dictatorships & democracies. Journal of History and Culture (co-published with the Fundacio Carles Pi i Sunyer)
 COMeIN.Journal of the Faculty of Information and Communication Sciences
 Digithum. A relational perspective of culture, individual and society in late modernity (co-published with the University of Antioquia - Colombia)
 ETHE. International Journal of Educational Technology in Higher Education (co-published with the University of Los Andes - Colombia)
 IDP. A journal about Internet, Law and Politics
 Mosaic. A journal about multimedia technologies and communication sponsored by the Faculty of Computer Science, Multimedia and Telecommunications
 Internet Policy Review. Journal of internet regulation (coedited with the Alexander Von Humboldt Institute for Internet and Society - HIIG)
 UOC R&I Working Papers
 Oikonomics. A journal about economics, business and society sponsored by the Faculty of Economics and Business

Alumni 
The Open University of Catalonia had total cumulative graduates of 85,700 as of academic year 2019-2020.

Honorary degree recipients 

 Mary Beard (2019)
 Manuel Borja-Vilell (2018)
 Alejandro Jadad (2018)
 Hanna Damásio (2012)
 Aina Moll (2012)
 Brenda M. Gourley (2011)
 Sir Timothy Berners-Lee (2008)
 Alain Touraine (2007)
 William J. Mitchell (2006)
 Jordi Pujol (2006)
 Tony Bates (2005)
 Josep Laporte (2003)

References

External links
 Universitat Oberta de Catalunya (UOC)

Distance education institutions based in Spain
Universities in Catalonia
Education in Barcelona
Catalonia
1994 establishments in Spain
Open universities
Universities and colleges in Spain